Zhang Mingqing is, as of 2008, the vice chairperson of the Association for Relations Across the Taiwan Straits (ARATS).

On a visit to Taiwan in October 2008, Zhang was attacked by pro-independence protesters in Tainan. There was a scuffle during which he was pushed to the ground. The assault was filmed and broadcast on Taiwanese television. Official Chinese news agency Xinhua expressed its "strong indignation". Taiwan's presidential office in turn expressed regrets over the incident; both sides condemned the violence.

References

People's Republic of China politicians from Shandong
Living people
Year of birth missing (living people)